Tour CGI (formerly the Tour EDF-GDF, then Tour Logica and Tour CB16) is an office skyscraper located in the French business district of La Défense (specifically in Courbevoie). This first generation tower is surrounded by the Aurore, Europe, CBX and D2 towers. It was completely dismantled and restructured in 2002–2003, then completely renovated in 2018–2019. It has 26 floors on the ground floor and six basement levels as well as a technical terrace on the ground floor. The CB16 complex is certified "HQE - Tertiary buildings in operation" and offers a range of market-leading services.

Since December 2019, its premises have been occupied by CGI as well as Esset (formerly Foncia IPM).

The code name for the tower's location in the La Défense master plan is CB16.

References

External links
 Official website

Skyscrapers in France
La Défense